Black Static, formerly The 3rd Alternative, is a British horror magazine edited by Andy Cox. The magazine has won the British Fantasy Award for "Best Magazine" while individual stories have won other awards. In addition, numerous stories published in Black Static/The 3rd Alternative have been reprinted in collections of the year's best fiction.

Black Static is published by TTA Press alongside sister publications Crimewave, which takes a similarly idiosyncratic approach to crime fiction, and the long-running science fiction magazine Interzone.

The 3rd Alternative 

Founded in 1994 as The 3rd Alternative, the magazine originally focused on a larger range of dark stories, often publishing science fiction, fantasy, and slipstream alongside horror. The 3rd Alternative ran for 42 issues before going on a short hiatus in 2005 after the acquisition of Interzone magazine by TTA Press.

Black Static 

In 2007 The 3rd Alternative was relaunched. Now focused exclusively on weird and horror fiction, the magazine was retitled Black Static. Authors published in Black Static include Nicholas Royle, Conrad Williams, Christopher Fowler, Aliette de Bodard, Steve Rasnic Tem, Nina Allan, Matthew Holness, Alexander Glass, Simon Avery, Gary McMahon, Gary Fry, Peter Tennant, Carole Johnston, Chris Kelso and Mike O'Driscoll. In addition, Black Static has also run opinion columns by Stephen Volk and Lynda E. Rucker as well book reviews by Peter Tennant and media reviews by Gary Couzens.

In February 2021, the format was changed to a double issue and the ability to purchase subscriptions was ended with the aim of winding the magazine down pending editor Andy Cox's retirement.

Awards 

During its 42 issue run, The 3rd Alternative won a number of awards including a British Fantasy Award for "Best Magazine" and a BFA short story award for "Dancing About Architecture" by Martin Simpson. Since the magazine relaunched as Black Static, the story "My Stone Desire" by Joel Lane has won a British Fantasy Award, while other stories have been reprinted in collections such as Best Horror of the Year.

References 

Science fiction magazines published in the United Kingdom
Horror fiction magazines
1994 establishments in the United Kingdom
Magazines established in 1994
Bi-monthly magazines published in the United Kingdom
Mass media in Cambridgeshire